Sahibzada Muhammad Yaqoob (born 15 March 1952) is a Pakistani politician who had been a member of the National Assembly of Pakistan, from June 2013 to May 2018.

Early life
He was born on 15 March 1952.

Political career

Yaqoob was elected to the National Assembly of Pakistan as a candidate of Jamaat-e-Islami Pakistan from Constituency NA-34 (Lower Dir) in 2013 Pakistani general election. He received 49,475 votes and defeated a candidate of Pakistan Tehreek-e-Insaf.

References

Living people
Pashtun people
Pakistani MNAs 2013–2018
1952 births